Nera Smajic is a Bosnian-born Swedish former football defender, who most recently played for FC Rosengård of Sweden's Damallsvenskan.

She represented Sweden in the 2002 U-19 European Championship.

References

1984 births
Living people
Swedish women's footballers
Swedish people of Bosnia and Herzegovina descent
Bälinge IF players
Damallsvenskan players
FC Rosengård players
Women's association football defenders